Mercurius (224/225 – 250 AD) was a Saracen soldier who became a Christian saint and martyr. He was born in the city of Eskentos in Cappadocia, in Eastern Asia Minor (modern-day Turkey). According to Christian tradition, he was the Lakhmid who killed Julian the apostate during his campaign in Persia.

Saint Mercurius was known in Arabic by the name Abu-Sayfain (أبو سيفين), which means "father of two swords", referring to the second sword given to him by the Archangel Michael.

St. Mercurius was born around 225 A.D. in Cappadocia (Eastern Asia Minor). His parents were converts to Christianity and they called him "Philopater" or "Philopatyr" (a Greek name which means 'Lover of the Father'). They raised him in a Christian manner. When he grew to adulthood (at the age of 17), he enlisted in the Roman army in the reign of Emperor Decius. He gained a great reputation among his superiors as a swordsman and a tactician in many battles. During this period, it is said that the Emperor grew very close to him.

Traditional biography

Family
Some accounts state that Philopater was born in Eskentos in Cappadocia. However, others refer to Rome as his place of birth. Mercurius was the son of Yares, an officer in the Roman army. One day, while Yares was hunting in the forest with his father, the two were attacked by an animal. The animal jumped on Yares' father, causing Yares to faint. While Yares was unconscious, he had a vision with a brilliant light and a voice saying:Yares, I am your God who loves you. I know that you have a good heart and that you hate the pagan idols. I want to inform you that your son, Philopatyr, will become like a tree bearing good fruits, and because of him, I will bless you and your wife. Philopatyr will be my witness and will defy all prejudice in my name.

Yares, his wife, and his son were baptized shortly after. All three were given new names. Yares became Noah, his wife became Saphina, and Mercurius became Philopater. News of their baptism spread quickly in the city and the prince ordered them to be arrested and thrown to wild animals. However, the animals did not harm them and the prince decided to release Noah and his family.
When the Barbarians attacked, Noah went to fight them. He was taken prisoner and was brought to their territory, where he was kept for seventeen months. When the war finally ended, he went back to his city and joined his family, but died shortly after.

St. Philopater Mercurius is also said to be the cousin of St. George of Cappadocia.

Military career of Saint Mercurius
After the death of Mercurius' father Noah, the pagan Roman Emperor Decius (ruled 249–251) chose him to replace his father. Described as very strong and courageous, Mercurius earned the respect of his fellow soldiers and gained renown as a swordsman. When the Barbarians attacked Rome, Decius went out to fight them but became afraid when he saw how many there were. Mercurius then came to him and said, "Do not be afraid, because God will kill our enemies and will bring us victory."

After several days of fighting, the Archangel Michael appeared to Mercurius holding a shining sword. The saint took the sword from the archangel, hence the name Abu Sayfain - "the father of two swords": a military sword and a divine sword. He conquered the Barbarians. When Decius heard news of the triumphant victory, he named Mercurius as a prince.

Martyrdom of Saint Mercurius

Nonetheless, in 249, Decius began his persecution of Christians, compelling everyone to offer sacrifices to his pagan gods. The Archangel Michael appeared to Mercurius and told him to remember God and not be fearful of persecution. The saint was encouraged and spent the whole night praying fervently, confessing his weakness to God.

The Emperor sent messengers to summon Mercurius to the palace, saying: "Dear Mercurius, let us go offer incense to the gods who helped us attain victory in the war." As they were leaving, Mercurius slipped through the crowd and went away. However, one of the guards reported his absence, and the Emperor called Mercurius and asked him: "Is it true that you refused to worship the idols who helped us during the war?" Mercurius declared himself a Christian, saying, "I do not worship anyone except my Lord and my God, Jesus Christ."

The Emperor tried to persuade him to give up his faith but failed. He then ordered Mercurius to be stripped of his rank and tortured. Fearing a revolt because the people loved Mercurius, the emperor had him bound in iron fetters and sent him to Caesarea. Mercurius was beheaded on 4 December 250 AD. He was only 25 years old.

Other traditions

After the end of the first persecution, the place of the saint's burial was revealed. Mercurius appeared to a poor man in the city and told him that he was "Mercurius, the Martyr of the Lord". "My body is buried in Cappadocia Gardens, under the old house on the way to the royal palace. My body looks as white as snow, because Jesus was present at the time of my martyrdom", said the saint.

The next morning, the man went to dig under the old house. He began to smell the scent of perfume, seeing the body of the saint. The news spread quickly and many people came to take a look at the blessed body. They moved it temporarily to the local church until they built a new church bearing his name where Mercurius' body was buried with respect and devotion.

A few years later, the Catholicos of Armenia and the Chief bishop of the Armenian Apostolic Church, visited Egypt and met with the Patriarch of Alexandria, the leader of the Coptic Orthodox Church. The latter asked him if Egypt could have part of the relics of Saint Mercurius to be placed in the church that bears his name in Egypt. On 9 Paoni (16 June), part of the blessed relics of Saint Mercurius were transferred to Egypt.

According to one tradition, Saint Basil once prayed before an icon on which Mercurius was portrayed as a soldier carrying a spear. He asked God not to permit the emperor Julian the Apostate (361-363) to return from his war against the Persians and resume his oppression of Christians. The image of the holy Great Martyr Mercurius depicted on the icon became invisible, only to reappear later with a bloodied spear. Julian the Apostate, on his Persian campaign, was mortally wounded by the spear of an unknown soldier.

The nuns and their abbess, Mother Irini at the St. Mercurius Monastery in Cairo credit the saint's intercession for the reversal of a government decision to confiscate their property for the Defense Ministry.

See also 
 Acts of Andrew and Bartholomew

References

External links

Account of his life on University College Cork website, with bibliography
Coptic account
Coptic Synexarium
St Philopateer Mercurius at the Church of St Mary and St Merkorious, Sydney
www.tamavireneforall.com All about St Mercurius in the words of Tamav Irene the Abbess of the convent of St Mercurius, Old Cairo, Egypt.
Catholic Online: Saint Mercurius
Santiebeati: Saint Mercurius

220s births
250 deaths
Saints from Roman Anatolia
Cappadocian Greeks
3rd-century Christian martyrs
Angelic visionaries
Michael (archangel)
Military saints